The Toruń tram system is a tramway in Toruń, Poland that has been in operation since 1891. A total of 55 trams of the 805Na type are in operation.

A recent  extension was built to serve Nicolaus Copernicus University in Toruń. It was originally projected to open in 2013, but the extension ultimately opened for service on 24 June 2014.

Rolling stock

Lines

References

Torun
Toruń
Metre gauge railways in Poland
Torun